The Cladobranchia are a taxonomic clade of nudibranchs, sea slugs, marine gastropod molluscs in the clade Dexiarchia.

Taxonomy

clade Metarminida
 Superfamily Metarminoidea This name is not available as a Superfamily name as it is not based on a genus. It is used here as no replacement name has yet been proposed.
Family Curnonidae
Family Dironidae
Family Embletoniidae
Family Goniaeolididae
Family Heroidae
Family Madrellidae
Family Pinufiidae
Family Proctonotidae

clade Euarminida
Superfamily Arminoidea
Family Arminidae
Family Doridomorphidae

clade Dendronotida
Superfamily Tritonioidea
Family Tritoniidae
Family Aranucidae
Family Bornellidae
Family Dotidae
Family Dendronotidae
Family Hancockiidae
Family Lomanotidae
Family Phylliroidae
Family Scyllaeidae
Family Tethydidae

clade Aeolidida
Superfamily Flabellinoidea (= Pleuroprocta)
Family Flabellinidae
Family Notaeolidiidae
Superfamily Fionoidea
Family Fionidae
Family Calmidae
Family Eubranchidae
Family Pseudovermidae
Family Tergipedidae
Superfamily Aeolidioidea
Family Aeolidiidae
Family Facelinidae
Family Glaucidae
Family Piseinotecidae

References

External links

 

Nudipleura